The siege of Iconium (Greek: Μάχη του Ικονίου, Turkish: Konya Muharebesi) was an unsuccessful attempt by the Turkish Seljuk Empire to capture the Byzantine city of Iconium, modern day Konya. After sacking Ani and Caesarea in 1063 and 1067, respectively (some sources suggest as early as 1064), the Byzantine army in the East was in too poor a shape to resist the advance of the Turks. Had it not been for the efforts of the emperor Romanos IV Diogenes the Byzantine Empire would have suffered her "Manzikert" disaster sooner. From Syria, a successful counter-attack drove the Turks back. After the attack on Iconium was repelled, Romanos IV launched his second campaign. Further campaigning was met with some success by Romanos, despite the ill nature of his army which had been poorly led since the death of Basil II. 

The victory was a short respite - sometime after Manzikert, in the midst of civil conflict, Iconium fell to the Turks. The city saw a brief return to Christendom during the First Crusade, possibly under Byzantine rule but the Turks counter-attacked at the Crusade of 1101 and Konya would form the capital of Byzantium's most dangerous opponent. On 18 May 1190, Iconium was briefly regained for Christianity by the forces of Frederick I, Holy Roman Emperor at the Battle of Iconium during the Third Crusade.

References

Sources
 

1060s in the Byzantine Empire

Iconium 1069
Iconium 1069
1069 in Asia
History of Konya
11th century in the Seljuk Empire